Andy Replogle (October 7, 1953 – April 10, 2012) was a Major League Baseball pitcher. Replogle was drafted in the ninth round of the 1975 Major League Baseball draft by the St. Louis Cardinals. Previously, he was drafted by the New York Mets, but did not sign with the team. Replogle was selected by the Baltimore Orioles in the Rule 5 draft on December 5, 1977. The following year, he was selected off waivers by the Milwaukee Brewers from the Orioles, and he played two seasons with the team. Later in his career, he signed with the Cincinnati Reds, but was released from the team before he played in a regular season game with them.

Replogle played at the collegiate level at Kansas State University.

References

External links

1953 births
2012 deaths
Arkansas Travelers players
Baseball players from South Bend, Indiana
Evansville Triplets players
Johnson City Cardinals players
Kansas State Wildcats baseball players
Major League Baseball pitchers
Milwaukee Brewers players
St. Petersburg Cardinals players
Vancouver Canadians players